Antennatus strigatus, known as the bandtail frogfish, is a species of fish in the family Antennariidae. It is native to the Eastern Pacific, where it ranges from the Gulf of California to Ecuador. It occurs in rocky reefs from the surface down to 15 m (49 ft), or more rarely down to 38 m (125 ft). This species is noted to be quite well-camouflaged, typically imitating snails or sponges. It is a demersal species that reaches 8 cm (3.1 inches) SL.

References 

Antennariidae
Taxa named by Theodore Gill
Fish described in 1863